Tommy McLain (born March 15, 1940) is an American swamp pop musician, best known as a singer but who also plays keyboards, drums, bass guitar, and fiddle.

Career
McLain first began performing in the 1950s, along with country singer Clint West. The two were both members of The Vel-Tones in the late 1950s and The Boogie Kings in the 1960s, and they recorded a duet, "Try to Find Another Man", in 1965. He also performed on Dick Clark's Caravan of Stars in the 1960s and DJed at Louisiana radio station, KREH. McLain's greatest fame was with his recording of the song "Sweet Dreams", which hit No. 15 on the U.S. Billboard Hot 100 chart in 1966. It reached No. 49 in the UK Singles Chart the same year.

He also wrote Freddy Fender's hit single, "If You Don't Love Me Alone (Leave Me Alone)". McLain appears along with the Mule Train Band in the film The Drowning Pool. McLain continues to perform in the American Deep south with his backing group the Mule Train Band.

In October 2007, McLain was inducted into The Louisiana Music Hall of Fame.

McLain was more recently featured as a guest artist on an album recorded by Larry Lange and his Lonely Knights of Austin, Texas, entitled Wiggle Room (2011), which debuted two brand new songs penned by McLain; perhaps the most notable one being, "Don't Make Me Leave New Orleans", a heart-felt ballad that McLain wrote in the aftermath of Hurricane Katrina. Plans are in the works for McLain to rejoin Larry Lange to record another album with the Lonely Knights.

The award-winning British artist Lily Allen, included Tommy McLain's cover of Fats Domino's song "Before I Grow Too Old", as one of her eight favorite songs on the popular British radio programme, Desert Island Discs, on 29 June 2014.

On August 26, 2022, McLain released his first album in over 40 years entitled I Ran Down Every Dream. This collaboration included 11 songs written by McLain and credits with numerous others including Elvis Costello, Nick Lowe (both of whom contribute co-writes), plus Jon Cleary, Denny Freeman, Ed Harcourt, Roy Lowe, Augie Meyers, Ivan Neville, Van Dyke Parks, Mickey Raphael, Steve Riley, Speedy Sparks, Warren Storm and others.

See also
List of 1960s one-hit wonders in the United States

References

1940 births
Living people
Singer-songwriters from Louisiana
American male singer-songwriters
The Boogie Kings members
Swamp pop music
People from Jonesville, Louisiana
20th-century American male singers
20th-century American singers
21st-century American male singers
21st-century American singers